Baralipton dohrni is a species of longhorn beetle endemic to Sri Lanka.

Maximum size recorded is 24 mm.

References 

Cerambycinae
Insects of Sri Lanka
Insects described in 1909